Acontia elaeoa is a moth of the family Noctuidae. It is found in Queensland.

The wingspan is about 20 mm. Adults have blotchy brown forewings, each with several pale marks along the costa. The hindwings are brown, fading at the base.

External links

Australian Faunal Directory
Australian Insects

Moths of Australia
elaeoa
Moths described in 1910